The Antietam Furnace Complex Archeological Site is an archeological site at Hagerstown, Washington County, Maryland. It is an eighteenth-century Iron furnace located along South Mountain. It operated circa 1768-1775 and produced pig iron, stoves, domestic iron wares, and possibly cannon.  It was probably the earliest iron furnace in the present day Washington County.

It was listed on the National Register of Historic Places in 1983.

References

External links
, including photo in 1976, at Maryland Historical Trust website

Archaeological sites in Washington County, Maryland
Archaeological sites on the National Register of Historic Places in Maryland
Province of Maryland
Buildings and structures in Hagerstown, Maryland
National Register of Historic Places in Washington County, Maryland